The 2008 California State Senate elections took place on November 4, 2008. Voters in California's odd-numbered State Senate districts, a total of 20, voted for their state senators. No seats changed parties and the Democratic Party maintained its 25-seat majority, while the Republican Party held 15 seats. Other elections also took place in California on November 4.

Only a single State Senate district, the 19th, was considered truly competitive by political analysts.

Overview

Composition

Results 
The following candidates are the official results from the California Secretary of State.

District 1

District 3

District 5

District 7

District 9

District 11

District 13

District 15

District 17

District 19

District 21

District 23

District 25

District 27

District 29

District 31

District 33

District 35

District 37

District 39

References 

State Senate
California
2008